The 1975 Jackson State Tigers football team represented the Jackson State University as a member of the Southwestern Athletic Conference (SWAC) during the 1975 NCAA Division II football season.

Schedule

References

Jackson State
Jackson State Tigers football seasons
Southwestern Athletic Conference football champion seasons
Jackson State Tigers football